This is a list of animated television series first aired in 2018.

See also
2018 in animation
2018 in anime
List of animated feature films of 2018

References

2018
2018
Television series
2018-related lists